Kanjwani railway station is a railway station which is found in Tehsil Tandlianwala , Punjab, Pakistan.

See also
 List of railway stations in Pakistan
 Pakistan Railways

References

External links

Railway stations in Faisalabad District
Railway stations on Shorkot–Sheikhupura line